Cristiano Andrei (born 14 May 1973) is a former Italian discus thrower.

His personal bests, 64.49 m set in 2003, at the end of the 2020 outdoor season is still the 8th best all-time performance of the Italian lists and in that year it was also the 22nd best result in the world top-lists.

Personal life
Nephew of the Olympic shot put champion in Los Angeles 1984, Alessandro Andrei, in 2005 he married the former hammer thrower Ester Balassini.

National titles
Andrei won five national championships at individual senior level.

Italian Athletics Championships
Discus throw: 2002, 2003 (2)
Italian Winter Throwing Championships
Discus throw: 2001, 2005, 2006 (3)

See also
 Italian all-time top lists - Discus throw

References

External links
 

1973 births
Living people
Italian male discus throwers
Athletics competitors of Centro Sportivo Carabinieri
Sportspeople from Florence
20th-century Italian people